Henri Kontinen and John Peers were the defending champions, but lost in the second round to Marcel Granollers and Horacio Zeballos.

Granollers and Zeballos went on to win the title, defeating Robin Haase and Wesley Koolhof in the final, 7–5, 7–5.

Seeds

Draw

Finals

Top half

Bottom half

References

External Links
Main draw

Rogers Cup Doubles
Men's Doubles